The Case Western Reserve Spartans are the varsity intercollegiate athletic teams of Case Western Reserve University, located in Cleveland, Ohio, United States. Case Western Reserve University competes at the NCAA Division III level. The Spartans compete in the University Athletic Association (UAA), except in football where the team competes as an associate member of the Presidents' Athletic Conference (PAC). The university offers 19 sports—10 men's sports and 9 women's sports.

All 19 varsity teams wear a commemorative patch on their uniforms honoring Case alumnus, M. Frank Rudy, inventor of the Nike air-sole.

The Spartans' primary athletic rival is Carnegie Mellon University.

History

The Case Western Reserve Spartans' heritage stems from the combination of two long and storied sports histories of Western Reserve University and Case Institute of Technology.

Mascots

Case, originally known as Case School of Applied Science, carried the name Scientists from 1918 to 1939. In 1940, the mascot was changed to the Rough Riders, in honor of their head coach Ray A. Ride. Case formally updated its school name in 1947 to Case Institute of Technology. Western Reserve originally used the mascot Pioneers from 1921 to 1927, until being forced to change by Marietta College, who claimed earlier usage of the namesake. The famous Red Cats mascot was then used beginning in 1928. Upon the merger of the two schools, the Spartans name was adopted in 1970, as the team is now known.

Conferences

In 1902, Case Tech and Western Reserve University were both founding members of the Ohio Athletic Conference (OAC). Western Reserve left the OAC in 1931 to compete as an independent, while Case Tech stayed in until 1948. Breaking away from independence looking to compete with larger schools, Western Reserve became a charter member of the Mid-American Conference (MAC) in 1946. After less than a decade, Western Reserve withdrew from the MAC in 1954, citing the need for the school to focus more energy on academics and less money and resources on athletics spearheaded by President John S. Millis.

Returning to their roots of competing in the same conference, Case Tech and Western Reserve became founding members of the Presidents' Athletic Conference (PAC) in 1955. When the athletic departments of the two universities merged in 1971 they dominated the PAC for several years. The university remained a member of the PAC until 1983. In the fall of 1984 the university joined the North Coast Athletic Conference (NCAC), a pioneer in gender equality in sports, as a charter member. In conjunction with other top research universities in the country, Case Western Reserve became a charter member of University Athletic Association (UAA) in 1986, while maintaining joint conference membership affiliation with the NCAC until the 1998-1999 school year. In 2014 the football team, while maintaining membership in the UAA, began competing as an associate member of the PAC.

Founding charter members of five conferences:
 Ohio Athletic Conference (OAC), 1902 (Case Tech and Western Reserve)
 Mid-American Conference (MAC), 1946 (Western Reserve)
 Presidents' Athletic Conference (PAC), 1955 (Case Tech and Western Reserve)
 North Coast Athletic Conference (NCAC), 1984 (Case Western Reserve)
 University Athletic Association (UAA), 1986 (Case Western Reserve)

NCAA National champions

Sports

Football 

Conference Titles:

Men's tennis 

The 2022 team finished the season again as the National Runner-Up, this time losing to another UAA foe, University of Chicago. In tournament play, the team defeated Ohio Northern, Wisconsin–Whitewater, Williams, and Middlebury. James Hopper and Jonathan Powell won the NCAA men's doubles national title. At the beginning of the season, the team won the 2022 ITA Division III Men’s National Team Indoor Championship.

In 2021, the team went undefeated in Division III regular season play, finishing as the National Runner-Up losing to Emory. In the tournament, the team defeated Illinois Tech, Gustavus Adolphus, Trinity (TX), and Washington (MO).

In 2019, Matthew Chen and James Hopper won the Division III doubles title in the 2019 ITA Cup.

In 2014, the Spartan men's tennis team was ranked in the Division III Top 10 for most of the season, and advanced to the NCAA Elite Eight before falling to Middlebury College. That same year, two CWRU tennis players, Eric Klawitter and Christopher Krimbill, won the NCAA men's doubles national title.

Conference Titles:

Men's cross country 

Since 1972 the Spartans have had fourteen All-Americans. In 1972 Greg Bowser finished 14th. In 1973 Jeff Tanchon & Greg Bowser finished 15th & 16th respectively. In 1974 Greg Bowser & Doug Leary finished 6th & 19th. In 1975 Peter Kummant finished 2nd, the best finish for any Spartan XC runner to date. In 1976 & 1977 Peter Kummant finished 6th & 10th. It took 16 years for the Spartans to put another runner on the podium. In 1993 Steve Cullen finished 16th. In 1994 teammates Steve Cullen and Brian Casselberry finished 19th & 27th. After another 10 year draught Aaron Johnston-Peck finished 7th in 2004. Most recently Sam Merriman finished 21st & 11th in 2016 & 2017. 

Additionally since 1946, 119 male athletes and 16 teams have represented the university, with the best finish occurring in 1986 with a 7th-place finish. Four of those athletes sent either pre-date the All-American designation and/or would be considered All-Americans under new guidelines.

Conference Titles:

Individual Champions:

Women's cross country

The women's cross country team earned five consecutive team qualifying years to the NCAA Championship Meet from 2006-2010. In 2006 the team was undefeated up until Nationals, this included beating several DI schools during the season. During this stretch, the Spartan women finished in the top 10 twice, including 2007, when the team finished sixth in the nation. individually during these five years, team members earned 8 All-American Titles, including multiple by future professional marathoner Esther Erb.

Conference Titles:

Men's basketball 

The 2022 team was the first team in school history to make the NCAA Division III men's basketball tournament, defeating Dubuque and Wisconsin-Oshkosh, before falling to Mary Hardin-Baylor in overtime in the Sweet 16.

Western Reserve's first varsity team was in 1897, only six years after the game was invented by Dr. James Naismith. Case Tech played its first varsity season in 1912.

The first college sporting event televised in Cleveland aired on December 18, 1947, where Western Reserve's basketball team defeated Fenn College, now the Cleveland State Vikings, at Adelbert Gym, 63-26.

Conference Titles and playoffs:

Baseball 

Varsity baseball teams for Western Reserve College date back to the 1870s. During this era, Clarence Emir Allen is famously credited as the first college baseball player to throw and perfect the curve ball, and notably never lost a game once mastering the "curve." Other notable players in school history include Bob Kelly, Paul O'Dea, and Ed Andrews.

Western Reserve won the PAC in 1967 and 1968.

In recent years, the Case Western Reserve baseball team has competed in the NCAA playoffs, earning spots in 2011, 2013, 2014, and 2019.

In 2011, Spartan third baseman Chad Mullins was named the D3Baseball.com Player of the Year after hitting .437 with eight home runs and 71 RBIs. Mullins also ranked in the Division III national top ten in hits, runs scored, and total bases. The 2013 team won two NCAA playoff games and the UAA title. The 2014 team set a school record for victories with 34, won the UAA title, and won four playoff games advancing to the NCAA Mideast Regional Championship.

From 2013 to 2017, Bianca Smith served as director of baseball operations; she would later become the first black woman professional baseball coach, hired by the Boston Red Sox in 2021.

Conference Titles and Playoffs:

Softball 

The 2022 team won the UAA and made it to the Sweet 16 of the NCAA Division III tournament, finishing the season 30-12.

During the 2018 season, Case Western Reserve softball team earned an at-large bid in the NCAA Division III tournament, making a deep run in the playoffs to nationals in Oklahoma City, Oklahoma, finishing the season ranked 6th nationally. The team won the first regional in school history, defeating Mt. Aloysius, St. Mary's, and Ohio Northern twice. The Spartans won the super regional against Hope, and achieved a win at nationals against Rowan, before being defeated by University of Texas at Tyler and Luther. The 2018 team finished the season 38-12. 

The softball team previously had made the NCAA Division III tournament in 2001.

Karen (Chambers) Farrell founded the university Softball team in 1996 and coached the first four seasons, winning three UAA titles in 1997, 1998, and 1999.

Conference Titles and Playoffs

Men's soccer 

The 2006 Men's Soccer team finished the season with a 17–2–2 record, a UAA title, and first-ever playoff appearance. The team reached the Sweet 16 in the NCAA Division III tournament appearance and concluded the season ranked 12th in the nation. In 2011, the team returned gain to the NCAA Division III tournament after winning the UAA and finishing 15–5. In 2018, the team reemerged to national prominence finishing 16–4–2 and making its deepest run in the NCAA DIII tournament making it to the "elite eight."

Conference Titles and Playoffs:

Men's outdoor track and field 

Since 1968 the university has had 29 Outdoor All-Americans, including 5 National Champions, and an additional 26 NCAA qualifiers. The first and only relay team to qualify did so in the 4x400 in 2017, consisting of Jon Haling, Andrew Ibibo, Joe Cabral, and Nate Wahner. From 1985-1999 the Spartans had 45 NCAC individual champions.

Notably, the 1946 Western Reserve team was coached by Cleveland Browns halfback Don Greenwood, while he was still a player.

Conference Titles:

Men's indoor track and field 

Conference Titles:

Women's soccer

The women's soccer team played their first season in 1984. The team made it to the NCAA tournament in 2011, 2019, and 2021.

In 2021, the Spartans went 16-2-2 and finished the regular season ranked 10th nationally. The 16 wins were the most victories in a single season in program history, also advancing three games into the tournament.

The 2022 season set a new record for wins in a single season at 20-1-1, under first year head coach Abby Richter, finishing as the National Runner Up losing to Johns Hopkins. 

Conference Titles and Playoffs:

Women's tennis

In 2022, the team made it to the third round of the NCAA Women's Division III Doubles Championships, before losing to the eventual Division III NCAA Champion, Claremont-Mudd-Scripps.

In 2018, doubles pair Nithya Kanagasegar and Madeleine Paolucci were named the first All-Americans in program history. Nationally ranked, they advanced to the quarterfinals of NCAA Women's Division III Doubles Championships in Claremont, California.

Women's volleyball 

During the 2010 and 2015 seasons, the team made the NCAA Division III Tournament, earning their first tournament win in 2015 led by coach Karen Farrell.

Wrestling

Case Western Reserve wrestling has won four individual NCAA Division III national titles and produced Olympic wrestler, William Kerslake.

Conference Titles:

University Athletic Association championships 

Football: 1988, 1996, 2007, 2008, 2009, 2011, 2016, 2017
Wrestling: 1988, 1991, 1993, 1994, 1996
Softball: 1997, 1998, 1999, 2014, 2022
Baseball: 2013, 2014, 2018, 2022
Men's Soccer: 2006, 2011
Women's Cross Country: 2006, 2008
Men's Basketball: 2023
Men's Track & Field (Outdoor): 1994
Men's Cross Country: 1993

Olympians

Fight song 

John F. Anderson, a Case Tech alum of 1933, composed the music and lyrics of the Case Western Reserve fight song.

Fight On
Fight on, you men of Case Reserve 
Make foemen fear your strength and verve 
Display the old unflinching nerve— 
Go, Case Reserve, fight on! 
In days of yore in annual bout 
Across the fence, we fought it out 
The fence is down, today we shout: 
Go, Case Reserve, fight on! 
The blue and white team we'll uphold 
Old Case Reserve will never fold 
So, on to vict'ries yet untold 
Go, Case Reserve, fight on!

Facilities

DiSanto Field 

DiSanto Field is a 2,400-seat multi-purpose stadium home to the football, men's soccer, women's soccer, and track and field teams.

The press box includes the Coach Bill Edwards president's suite, named after the College Football Hall of Fame inductee coach. In 2008, the eight-lane track surrounding the field was named Coach Bill Sudeck Track. In 2014, the Wyant Field House opened, which included the 4500-square foot Steve Belichick Varsity Weight Room, gifted by Bill Belichick in honor of his father.

Nobby's Ballpark  
Home to the Case Western Reserve Spartans baseball team, Nobby's Ballpark, seats 500 fans and sit between the streets of East 115th and East 118 along Wade Park Ave and Finnegan's Way. The ballpark opened in 2006 thanks to the contribution of alumnus Nobby Lewandowski. In 2009, the new public address system and naming of the press box was provided by Tom and Cynthia Friedberg. In 2013, Nobby Lewandowski gifted a state-of-the-art scoreboard. An Astroturf infield was installed prior to the 2018 season, increasing playability in poor weather, while the outfield consists of natural grass.

Mather Park 

Mather Park is home to the Spartan softball team and seats 250 fans. The park sits along Mistletoe Drive near its intersection with Wade Park Ave. In April 2008, the facility was officially renamed after the Flora Stone Mather Alumnae Association, after its endowment was transferred to Case Western Reserve University. In 2009, Vice President for Student Affairs, Glenn Nicholls, made a donation in honor of his late wife, Peggy, for a new press box. The field was dedicated on April 15, 2009. A state-of-the-art scoreboard was added during the 2012 season by the Mather Alumnae Association.

Horsburgh Gymnasium 

Home to the Spartan basketball, wrestling and volleyball, Horsburgh Gymnasium, holds a capacity of 1,600 fans. Named after alumnus Robert G. Horsburgh (1914), the gymnasium opened May 24, 1957, being refurbished and physically incorporated into the Veale Center complex rededicated on April 22, 1998.

Adelbert Gymnasium 

The original Adelbert Gymnasium was constructed in 1888, followed by the much larger armory expansion being erected between 1918 and 1919, dedicated on June 1, 1919. Originally built for use in World War I, the war ended before construction was finished, so it was used only for athletics. Basketball played there for over 50 years, ending during the 1969-1970 season. In 2013, the facility was upgraded with a refurbished playing court. Adelbert Gym is most commonly used for varsity athletic practice as well as intramural, club sport, and campus recreational functions. For variety athletics official contests, it is still used for heritage-type basketball games and wrestling matches.

References

External links
 CWRU website